Joo Ik-seong (born 10 September 1992) is a South Korean professional footballer who plays as a midfielder for Taichung Futuro and the South Korea national team.

Career statistics

Club

Notes

References

1992 births
Living people
South Korean footballers
South Korean expatriate footballers
Association football midfielders
K League 2 players
K3 League players
Taiwan Football Premier League players
FC Seoul players
Daejeon Hana Citizen FC players
Hwaseong FC players
Hang Yuen F.C. players
Taichung Futuro F.C. players
South Korean expatriate sportspeople in Taiwan
Expatriate footballers in Taiwan
Footballers from Seoul